Ramin, Rokni, Hesam are a UAE-based artist collective from Iran, consisting of Ramin Haerizadeh (1975, Tehran), Rokni Haerizadeh (1978, Tehran) and Hesam Rahmanian (1980, Knoxville) who's working and living together described as a project, since 2009.

History
The three artists met in underground drawing and painting classes in the early 90s, while Iran was recovering from an eight-year war (Iran-Iraq: 1980-1988). These classes were formed as a result of the Iranian Cultural Revolution that lead many students, educators and lecturers to take their classes inside their private homes.

Ramin Haerizadeh, Rokni Haerizadeh and Hesam Rahmanian's early collaborative practice formed as early as 1999 in Tehran, though it was flourished in the UAE where the artists reside since 2009. Their home is a spectrum of a studio, a library, film set, research center, a museum and sketchbook for their upcoming project.

Work
The artists work individually and collectively and often incorporate friends and people from different walks of life into their practice. The trio's work is often referred to as a landscape where the complex nature of processing is integrated in the nested system that forms the landscape of their shows.

Generosity is in the core of their practice. They have practiced a model of how to collaborate, creating a self-sustaining creative life; how to build an aesthetic and undermine it; how to be politically acute and humorous, generous and eccentric. In the trios art making, production is performance. And the performance is a collective action leading to dance, art, and politics. According to Laura Marks, "preferring the intimacy of a few to the cruel judgments of a social order, they create a flourishing private utopia that turns abjection inside out, to release a seemingly endless supply of pleasure and invention. Living well is the best revenge."

The collective has done a site-responsive project with OGR Torino as collateral events of the 59th Venice Biennale (2022), NYU Abu Dhabi Art Gallery (2022),  Schirn Kunsthalle, Frankfurt (2020), Frye Art Museum, Seattle (2019), Officine Grandi Riparazioni (OGR), Turin (2018), MACBA, Barcelona (2017), Institute of Contemporary Art (ICA), Boston (2015), Kunsthalle Zurich (2015) and Den Frie Udstilling, Copenhagen (2015).

The collective is also notable for receiving the Black Mountain College Prize, 2022, and Han Nefkens Foundation/MACBA Award (2016). The trio has additionally been a part of group exhibitions including A Century of the Artist's Studio: 1920-2020, Whitechapel Gallery, London, UK, Biennale of Sydney where they had a large installation I Prefer Talking to Doctors About Something Else at The Powerhouse Museum (2020), the Louisiana Museum of Modern Art in Denmark for Homeless Souls (2019) for which they won the 6th Global Fine Art Award in Global Humanity category, The inaugural Toronto Biennial of Art 2019, and a multi-room installation for The Creative Act in Guggenheim Abu Dhabi (2017), as well as other exhibitions at three different locations for 9th Liverpool Biennial (2016). In 2015, the collective had the installation at Queensland Gallery for 8th Asia Pacific Triennial of Contemporary Art.

Selected solo exhibitions
OGR - Officine Grandi Riparazioni at Venice, 22 APRIL- 27 NOVEMBER, 2022.
NYU Abu Dhabi Art Gallery (NYUAD), Abu Dhabi, 2022. 1 March - June 12, 2022.
Schirn Kunsthalle, Frankfurt, Germany (2020). 3 September until 13 December 2020.
Frye Museum, Seattle, USA (2019). JANUARY 26 – APRIL 28, 2019.
OGR - Officine Grandi Riparazioni, Turin, Italy (2018). 12 Jul 18 - 30 Sep 18.
MACBA, Barcelona, Spain (2017). October 28, 2017 to January 7, 2018.
Institute of Contemporary Art (ICA), Boston, USA (2015). Dec 16, 2015 – Mar 27, 2016.
Den Frie Centre of Contemporary Art, Copenhagen, Denmark (2015). November 7, 2015 – February 28, 2016.
Kunsthalle, Zurich, Switzerland (2015). 21.02.2015-17.05.2015.

Selected group exhibitions
2022
Artists Making Books: Poetry to Politics, British Museum, London, UK 
Ridiculously Yours! Art, Awkwardness And Enthusiasm, BundesKunsthalle, Bonn, Germany 
A Century of the Artist's Studio : 1920-2020, Whitechapel Gallery, London, UK
2020
Around the Days in Eighty Worlds, CAPC musée d'art contemporain de Bordeaux, France 
I Put a Spell On You: On Artist Collaborations, SCAD Museum of Art, Georgia, USA 
Constructions of Truth, Museum of Contemporary art and Design, Manila, Philippines
2019
Grassi Museum, Leipzig, Germany
Museo d’Arte Contemporanea di Lissone (MAC), Italy
Centro de Arte Contemporaneo de Quito, Ecuador
Museo Storico dell Città di Lecce (MUST), Italy
Louisiana Museum of Modern Art, humlebaek, Denmark
The Phillips Collection in Partnership with the New Museum, Washington DC
2018
BACKLIT Gallery, Nottingham
2017
(BAK), Utrecht, Netherlands
The Guggenheim, Abu Dhabi, UAE
Rock, Paper, Scissors: Positions in Play, National Pavilion of United Arab Emirates, 57th Venice Biennale
Speak, Lokal, Zurich Kunsthalle, Zurich, Switzerland

Biennales
The 22nd Biennale of Sydney, Australia (2020)
The inaugural Toronto Biennial of Art (2019) 
Busan Biennale, South Korea (2018)
The 9th Liverpool Biennial, UK (2016)
The 8th Asia Pacific Triennial, Brisbane, Australia (2015)

Awards
Black Mountain College Prize, 2022
OGR TORINO PRIZE, 2017
2nd Han Nefkens Foundation-MACBA Award, 2016

Selected collections
British Museum, London, UK
Städel Museum, Frankfurt, Germany
Museum of Applied Arts and Sciences, Powerhouse museum, Sydney, Australia
Louisiana museum of Modern Art, Copenhagen, Denmark
Frye Art Museum, Seattle, Washington
Fundació Han Nefkens, Barcelona, Spain
Collection Le Centre National des Arts Plastiques, Paris, France
Borusan Contemporary Art Collection, Istanbul
Los Angeles County Museum of Art (LACMA)
Guy & Myriam Ullens Foundation Collection

Publications
2020 EITHER HE’S DEAD OR MY WATCH HAS STOPPED, GROUCHO MARX (WHILE GETTING THE PATIENT’S PULSE), 2020, Schirn Kunsthalle Frankfurt, Distanz Verlag, 
2018 Forgive me distant wars for bringing flower home, 2018, Corraini Edizioni, 
2016 Her Majesty?, 2016, Edition Patrick Frey, 
2015 Ramin Haerizadeh Rokni Haerizadeh Hesam Rahmanian, 2015, Mousse Publishing,

References

Artist groups and collectives